William Rainey Harper College is a public community college in Palatine, Illinois. It was established by referendum in 1965 and opened in September 1967.  It is named for William Rainey Harper, a pioneer in the junior college movement in the United States and the first president of the University of Chicago.

Campus

Location

Harper also offers classes and services at other locations:
 Harper College Learning and Career Center in Prospect Heights, Illinois
 The Harper Professional Center in Schaumburg, Illinois
 Harper College works in partnership with the Illinois Small Business Development Center (ISBDC), which is part of the Harper Professional Center in Schaumburg.
 Harper College works in partnership with the North Suburban Cook County American Job Center in Wheeling, Illinois

Architecture

The campus was designed to have an informal layout. The architectural concept uses scale and placement of buildings, multilevel plazas, brick, wood and concrete building materials and glass window walls to give a variety of interior and exterior views. The structures are built into the natural contours of the land, with entrances on several levels. According to the architects Hellmuth, Obata + Kassabaum Inc. (HOK), Avanté incorporates energy-saving elements using a holistic approach.

Academics

Harper College offers more than 50 transfer options, allowing students to earn an associate degree before transferring to a four-year college or university to complete a bachelor's degree. The college also offers more than 40 career programs which grant an associate degree or certificate and provide the skills necessary to enter the workforce. These programs range in length from sixteen weeks to two years.

All courses, educational programs, counseling services, and distance learning programs are accredited by the Higher Learning Commission. The college is also home to an award-winning Speech & Debate team. In the past 16 years, the team has won the Illinois Intercollegiate Speech and Debate Tournament on 7 occasions.

Harper offers 15 Study Abroad programs spread amongst Central America, Europe, and Asia. A few programs (3) are directly administered by the College; on the other hand, most are in conjunction with the Illinois Consortium for International Studies and Programs (ICISP).

Service area
Harper College District 512 comprises these communities: Arlington Heights, Barrington, Barrington Hills, Elk Grove Village, Hoffman Estates, Inverness, Lake Barrington, Mount Prospect, North Barrington, Palatine, Prospect Heights, Rolling Meadows, Schaumburg, South Barrington, Tower Lakes, Wheeling and small portions of Buffalo Grove, Carpentersville, Deer Park, Des Plaines, Fox River Grove, Hanover Park and Roselle.

College sports

Football
The football program was eliminated in January 2012.

 2003 NJCAA Division III National Champions
 2004 NJCAA Division III National Champions
 2008 NJCAA Division III National Champions
 Notable coaches, John Eliasik (member of NJCAA and Region IV Halls-of-Fame) and Dragan Teonic (2008 National Champions).

Cross country
NJCAA National Division III Champions 2011
NJCAA National Division III Champions 2012
NJCAA National Division III Champions 2013
NJCAA National Division III Champions 2014
NJCAA National Division III Champions 2015
NJCAA National Division III Champions 2016
NJCAA National Division III Champions 2017
NJCAA National Division III Champions 2018

Track and field
NJCAA National Division III Champions 2005
NJCAA National Division III Champions 2006
NJCAA National Division III Champions 2007
NJCAA National Division III Champions 2008
NJCAA National Division III Champions 2009
NJCAA National Division III Champions 2011
NJCAA National Division III Champions 2012
NJCAA National Division III Runners-Up 2013

Wrestling
Coach Dan Loprieno inducted in 2008 to the NJCAA Region IV Hall of Fame.
NJCAA 2010 Wrestling Champions
NJCAA Division III National Champions in 2006 and 2001. The 2006-07 team finished second in the nation, earned fifth consecutive district title and had 10 National qualifiers and seven All-Americans.

Women's basketball
Julie Jestus, 2006 NJCAA Region IV Hall of Fame

Women's volleyball

NJCAA Division III National Champions 2016
NJCAA Division III National Runners-Up 2017

Notable alumni
 Angelo Dawkins, WWE professional wrestler, One half of the tag team, The Street Profits.
 Quincy Black, linebacker for the Tampa Bay Buccaneers
 Curtis Blaydes (attended), professional Mixed Martial Artist, current UFC Heavyweight Contender
 Will Brooks, football player, MMA fighter for the PFL, formerly with the UFC and former Bellator MMA Lightweight Champion
 Mauro Fiore, class of 1984, cinematographer In 2010, Fiore won the Academy Award for Cinematography for "Avatar."
 Jason and Clay Guida, professional mixed martial arts fighters
 Dave Kingman, 1968, Major League Baseball Player - 440 Career Home Runs.
 Charlie Kirk, 2015, activist and talk show host (attended)
 E. E. Knight, class of 1985, science fiction and fantasy author
 Al Levine (born 1968), Major League Baseball pitcher
 John Loprieno, class of 1980: actor, writer, director
 Marlee Matlin, actress. In 1986 she won both the Academy Award for Best Actress and the Golden Globe Award for Best Actress in a Drama for her role in Children of a Lesser God.
 Rosemary Mulligan, Illinois state legislator, class of 1982
 Steve Octavien, linebacker for the Dallas Cowboys
 Haley Reinhart, singer-songwriter and actress
 Mike Rio, junior college national wrestling champion at 149 lbs; current MMA fighter; formerly for the Ultimate Fighting Championship
 Christopher J. Schneider, professor of sociology at Wilfrid Laurier University.
 Rob Sherman (1953–2016), political activist, perennial candidate, and businessman

References

External links

Harper College Athletics

Community colleges in Illinois
Palatine, Illinois
Universities and colleges in Cook County, Illinois
Educational institutions established in 1965
1965 establishments in Illinois
NJCAA athletics